De Dhakka is a 2008 Indian Marathi-language comedy-drama film directed by Atul Kale and Sudesh Manjrekar. Based on the American film Little Miss Sunshine (2006),  the film's story revolves on a lower-class family.

Plot
The story revolves around the Jadhav family. Makarand (Makarand Anaspure), after spending all his wealth, has invented an auto part which he claims will drastically lower the fuel consumption of vehicles. But being from a rural background and having no formal education, he is never taken seriously. Suryabhanrao (Shivaji Satam), Makarand's father, leaves no opportunity to blame his son for selling all his land on failed pursuits. Sumti (Medha Manjrekar) is Makarand's humble second wife. Dhanaji (Siddharth Jadhav) is Makarand's petty thief brother-in-law. Sayali and Kisna are Makarand's children. While Sayali has passion for dance, Kisna wishes to be a wrestler. While the family is going through an economic crisis, a golden opportunity is presented when Makarand's daughter Sayali is selected for the final round of a dance competition with a huge prize money. The family scrapes their last resources and leaves on a life changing journey to reach the competition venue. Since railway tickets are not available, Dhanaji arranges for a rickshaw to take the family to Mumbai. While on the way to Mumbai, the family is intercepted by the police who reveal that Dhanaji actually stole the rickshaw and gagged the driver to a tree. Makarand, in a bid to save his family from arrest, snatches the officer's gun and threatens him on gunpoint. The officer reluctantly lets them go after taking an undertaking that they will appear in the police station after their job is done. Further on the way, the rickshaw's clutch plate gets damaged, forcing the gang to push the rickshaw everytime it needs to be started. On one such occasion, Kisna falls down unconscious while pushing the rickshaw. After medical examination, the doctor reveals that he is suffering from asthma. Kisna, in a fit of rage and out of shame, runs out of the rickshaw, claiming that he won't wrestle. Sumi slaps and angrily reprimands her son for being a coward and running away from his weakness. Further during a night halt, the duo of musicians accompanying them angrily leave due to non-payment of their dues. In a heated moment, Makarand blames both Dhanaji and Sumi for being the cause of his troubles, but soon realises his mistake and asks for forgiveness. But the biggest calamity befalls on the Jadhav family, when Subhanrav gets a heart attack on the way. The family has him admitted in a hospital where the doctors reveal that he has slipped into a coma, due to his heavy alcohol consumption. The family decides to leave for Mumbai instead of weeping in the hospital. 

Upon reaching Mumbai, Dhanaji accidentally breaks the harmonium of the musician. Makarand and Kisna, after witnessing the level of competition, try to dissuade Sayali from participating, out of fear of losing. But the make up artist encourages them to let Sayali participate. Meanwhile Subhanrav awakens from coma and runs away from the hospital to reunite with his family. Sayali participates and comes third after a thunderous applause from the audience. 

After the family returns home, Makarand is shocked to find out that a client, whom he had offered the auto part illegally copied his invention and marketed it as his own. Dhanaji then reveals that he had actually sold that part to arrange for money to buy a new harmonium. The family angrily reprimands Dhanaji for his nature and deed, but Makarand realises that whatever he did was for Sayali's own good. He forgives him and resolves to start life afresh.

Next day, while leaving for work, his friend who had introduced him to that client reveals to him that he had actually got his auto part patented 6 months back. Yesterday when that client proclaimed on TV that he has invented that part, his team contacted him and sent him a legal notice of having stolen the part. The patent documents also proved that Makarand is the real inventor. His friend reveals that the client is coming today with the royalty money of Rs 1 crore. The family rejoices as the credits roll.

Cast
 Shivaji Satam as Suryabhan Jadhav
 Makarand Anaspure as Makarand Suryabhan Jadhav
 Siddhartha Jadhav as Dhanajirao (Dhanaji/Dhanya)
 Medha Manjrekar as Sumati Jadhav (Sumi) 
 Saksham Kulkarni as Kisna Makrand Jadhav
 Gauri Vaidya as Sayali Makrand Jadhav 
 Hrishikesh Joshi as Musician
 Abhijeet Deshpande as Amar
 Sanjay Khapre as Nachya
 Mukta Barve as Special appearance in the song
 Sachit Patil as Dance Show Host (In Mumbai)
 Atul Kale as Dhanaji's Doctor
 Kamlakar Satpute as Makeup Artist
 Dhananjay Mandrekar as Inpsector

Reception
De Dhakka was a success at the box office. The movie collected  on the third week.

Accolades
Arati Ankalikar-Tikekar received the Maharashtra State Film Award, the V. Shantaram Award and the Maharashtra Times Award for Best Playback Singer.

Remakes
It was remade in Kannada as Crazy Kutumba (2010). A Hindi remake is under production, with Sanjay Dutt will play the father character.

Sequel
A sequel to the film, titled De Dhakka 2, was announced in 2020. It is directed by Mahesh Manjrekar and Sudesh Manjrekar, under the banner of Ameya Vinod Khopkar Entertainment and Skylink Entertainment.

References

External links
 De Dhakka 2
 

2000s Marathi-language films
2008 films
Indian remakes of American films
Marathi films remade in other languages
Indian comedy-drama films
2008 comedy-drama films
Films directed by Sudesh Manjrekar
Films directed by Atul Kale